Maria Carolina (Maria Carolina Louise Josepha Johanna Antonia; 13 August 1752 – 8 September 1814) was Queen of Naples and Sicily as the wife of King Ferdinand IV and III, who later became King of the Two Sicilies. As de facto ruler of her husband's kingdoms, Maria Carolina oversaw the promulgation of many reforms, including the revocation of the ban on Freemasonry, the enlargement of the navy under her favorite, Sir John Acton and the expulsion of Spanish influence. She was a proponent of enlightened absolutism until the advent of the French Revolution, when, in order to prevent its ideas gaining currency, she made Naples a police state.

Born an archduchess of Austria, the thirteenth child of Empress Maria Theresa and Emperor Francis I, Maria Carolina married Ferdinand as part of an Austrian alliance with Spain, of which Ferdinand's father was king. Following the birth of a male heir in 1775, Maria Carolina was admitted to the Privy Council. Thereafter, she dominated it until 1812, when she was sent back to Vienna. Like her mother, Maria Carolina took pains to make politically advantageous marriages for her children. Maria Carolina promoted Naples as a centre of the arts, patronising painters Jacob Philipp Hackert and Angelica Kauffman, and academics Gaetano Filangieri, Domenico Cirillo and Giuseppe Maria Galanti. Maria Carolina, abhorring how the French treated their queen, her sister Marie Antoinette, allied Naples with Britain and Austria during the Napoleonic and French Revolutionary Wars. As a result of a failed Neapolitan invasion of French-occupied Rome, she fled to Sicily with her husband in December 1798. One month later, the Parthenopean Republic was declared, which repudiated Bourbon rule in Naples for six months. Deposed as Queen of Naples for a second time by French forces, in 1806, Maria Carolina died in Vienna in 1814, a year before her husband's restoration to Naples.

Maria Carolina was the last surviving child of Maria Theresa. She was also the last queen of Naples and Sicily before the unification of the two into the Kingdom of the Two Sicilies.

Early life

Born on 13 August 1752 at the Schönbrunn Palace in Vienna, Maria Carolina Louise Josepha Johanna Antonia was the thirteenth and sixth surviving child of Maria Theresa, Queen of Hungary and Bohemia and ruler of the Habsburg dominions, and Francis I, Holy Roman Emperor. She was a namesake of her elder sisters – Maria Carolina, who died two weeks after her first birthday, and Maria Carolina, who died several hours after being baptised – but she was known as Charlotte by her family. Her godparents were King Louis XV of France and his wife, Maria Leszczyńska. Maria Carolina was the daughter who resembled her mother most.

Maria Carolina formed a very close bond with her youngest sister, Marie Antoinette. From very early on they shared the same governess, Countess Lerchenfeld. A testament to their closeness is the fact that when one caught an illness the other did too. In August 1767 Maria Theresa separated the two girls, hitherto raised together under the auspices of Countess Marie von Brandis, because of their bad behaviour. Soon after in October of the same year, Maria Carolina's sister Maria Josepha, destined to marry Ferdinand IV of Naples as part of an alliance with Spain, died during a smallpox epidemic. Anxious to save the Austro-Spanish alliance Charles III of Spain, father of Ferdinand IV, requested one of Maria Josepha's sisters as a replacement. The empress offered the court of Madrid, negotiating on behalf of that of Naples, Maria Amalia or Maria Carolina. Because Maria Amalia was five years older than his son, Charles III opted for the latter. Maria Carolina reacted badly to her engagement, crying, entreating and saying that Neapolitan marriages were unlucky. Her objections, however, did not delay her preparation for her new role as Queen of Naples by the Countess of Lerchenfeld. Nine months later, on 7 April 1768, Maria Carolina married Ferdinand IV of Naples by proxy, her brother Ferdinand representing the bride-groom.

Early reign
The fifteen-year-old Queen of Naples journeyed at leisure from Vienna to Naples, making stops at Mantua, Bologna, Florence, and Rome on the way. She entered the Kingdom of Naples on 12 May 1768, disembarking at Terracina, where she took leave of her native attendants. From Terracina, she and her remaining suite, comprising her brother, the Grand Duke of Tuscany, and his wife Maria Luisa of Spain, ventured to Poztella, where she met her husband, whom she found "very ugly". To the Countess of Lerchenfeld, she wrote, "I love him only out of duty..." Ferdinand was not taken with her either, declaring, after their first night together, "She sleeps like the dead and sweats like a pig."

Maria Carolina's dislike of her husband, however, did not get in the way of her bearing children, as her most important wifely duty was to perpetuate the dynasty. In total, Maria Carolina bore Ferdinand eighteen children, of whom seven survived into adulthood including his successor, Francis I, the last Holy Roman Empress, a Grand Duchess of Tuscany, the last Queen of the French, and a Princess of Asturias.

Fall of Tanucci 
Ferdinand, having received a lacklustre education from the Prince of San Nicandro, lacked the ability to rule, relying completely on his father Charles III of Spain's counsel, communicated by Bernardo Tanucci. Pursuant to Empress Maria Theresa's instructions, Maria Carolina gained Ferdinand's trust by feigning interest in his favourite activity—hunting. With it, she obtained a back door to the administration of the state, to be fully realised only by the birth of an heir in 1775, and her consequent admission to the Privy Council. Until then, Maria Carolina presided over the rejuvenation of Neapolitan court life, largely neglected since the advent of her husband's regency. Academics Gaetano Filangieri, Domenico Cirillo, and Giuseppe Maria Galanti frequented her salon, among others.

Tanucci's fall from grace came about over an argument with Maria Carolina regarding Freemasonry, of which she was an adherent. Acting on orders from Charles III, Tanucci revived a law from 1751 banning Freemasonry in response to the discovery of a Masonic lodge among the royal regiment. Angered, the queen expressed to Charles III her opinion that Tanucci was ruining the country through the medium of a letter written by her husband, thus making it look as if it was his idea. Resigned to the queen's wishes, Ferdinand dismissed Tanucci in October 1776, causing a rift with his father. The appointment of Tanucci's successor, the Marquis of Sambuca, Maria Carolina's powerless puppet, represented the end of Spanish influence in Naples, hitherto virtually a province of that country. Maria Carolina proceeded to alienate large swaths of the nobility by replacing the influence of Spain with that of Austria. Her unpopularity among the nobility was increased by her attempts to curb their prerogative.

Acton and the military

Without Tanucci in government, the queen alone ruled Naples and Sicily, assisted by her French-born, English favourite, Sir John Acton, from 1778 onwards. Acting on her brother the Holy Roman Emperor Joseph II's advice, Maria Carolina and Acton revamped the Neapolitan navy, then neglected, opening 4 marine colleges and commissioning 150 ships of various sizes. The merchant navy, too, was augmented by trade pacts with Russia and Genoa. Charles III, having declared war on Great Britain in alliance with the United States, was angered by Acton's appointment to the Ministry of War and of Marine because he felt his Spanish candidate, Don Antonio Otero, was more worthy of such a high government post by virtue of the fact he wasn't English. Maria Carolina once again replied using a letter written by the king, expounding to Charles III that Acton, the son of a French woman, was not English and that he was appointed before Spanish hostilities with Britain broke out. Charles's attacks against Acton only served to endear the latter more to the queen, who proceeded to appoint him Field-Marshal. Acton's reforms were not restricted to the expansion of the navy; at the same time, he cut the expenditure of his department by 500,000 ducats and invited foreign drill-sergeants and officers to fill vacancies in the army. Acton and Maria Carolina were seen to have become so close by 1782 that, according to the Sardinian ambassador in Naples, people falsely believed they were lovers. That the rumour was untrue was not known to the king, who tried several times to "surprise you together" and threatened to kill them both in a rage. In response, Maria Carolina set spies on her husband, but a reconciliation was soon achieved. As part of this rapprochement, Acton went to live in Castellamare, but returned to Naples three times a week to see the queen.

Artistic patronage and the death of Charles III

Maria Carolina patronised German-Swiss artists, foremostly Angelica Kauffman, who famously painted the queen’s family in an informal garden setting in 1783, and gave her daughters lessons in drawing. Maria Carolina showered Kauffman with gifts, but she preferred the artistic circles in Rome to Naples. The queen’s patronage was not restricted to portrait painters: she allotted landscape painter Jacob Philipp Hackert a wing of the palace at Francavilla. Like Kauffman, he gave lessons to the queen’s children and enjoyed her confidence. On recommendation from Hackert, the king and queen restored the statues of Palazzo Farnese and brought them to Naples. In 1784, the queen established the philanthropic San Leucio colony, a village with its own unique laws and customs whose sole object was to weave silk. She also commissioned ornamental snuff boxes and jewellery from goldsmiths.

In 1788, with the death of King Charles III, Neapolitan-Spanish relations improved. The new king, Charles IV, was eager to be on good terms with his brother, the King of Naples, sending the Spanish fleet to salute to him. To consolidate their reconciliation, Charles IV proposed that his daughter marry the king and queen’s eldest son, the Duke of Calabria. While the king supported the match, Maria Carolina shunned it. Like her mother, she had carefully chosen the prospective husbands and wives of her children, matches that were to cement political alliances of her choosing. The death of the queen’s nephew Crown Prince Francis of Austria’s wife, Duchess Elisabeth of Württemberg, afforded her an opportunity to fulfil her marital ambitions. Her daughters Maria Theresa and Luisa married Crown Prince Francis and Ferdinand III, Grand Duke of Tuscany, respectively, during the Neapolitan royal family's visit to Vienna in 1790.

End of enlightened absolutism 

Maria Carolina was anxious to improve Neapolitan-Papal relations, which had deteriorated owing to arguments with Pope Pius VI over ecclesiastical laws and the investiture and choice of bishops. Consequently, Naples had stopped paying its annual tribute of 7,000 ducats. Therefore, Maria Carolina arranged a meeting with the pope. To emphasise their desire to see him, the king and queen arrived in Rome, en route to Naples from Vienna, earlier than expected, where they were greeted by Pius VI in a private audience. The pope agreed to cede to the king the right of appointing bishops to vacant sees. Thus, because the king and queen had not made any concessions in return, the prestige of Naples was augmented. On leaving, Maria Carolina was presented with the Golden Rose, a great mark of Papal favour.

The return from Vienna marked a new epoch in the politics of Naples. Alarmed by developments in France, especially in regards to her favourite sister, Marie Antoinette, Maria Carolina ended her experiment in enlightened absolutism and started on a reactionary course. She rejected the French Revolution and was determined to prevent its ideology gaining prevalence in Naples. She did this by sub-dividing Naples into twelve police wards, controlled by government-appointed commissioners, replacing the popularly elected alderman system. The effectiveness of the wards was increased by the creation of a secret police force, which had in its pay spies of every class. It was through her secret police that Maria Carolina learned of her substantial decline in popularity among all classes of society.

In an attempt to please Great Britain, with a military alliance in mind, the queen deigned to meet the wife of the English ambassador, Emma Hamilton, in audience, despite the fact that the British Queen, Charlotte of Mecklenburg-Strelitz, had not yet received her. However, they soon struck up a friendship, Emma singing duets with the king and dining privately with the royal family. The queen, whom Emma thought "most excellent and strictly good and upright", was drawn closer to Emma by her willingness to betray Britain's diplomatic secrets.

The Sémonville affair and the First Coalition

King Louis XVI of France and Queen Marie Antoinette were arrested on 10 August 1792. Hence, the Neapolitan government refused to recognise French diplomatist Baron Armand de Mackau's recently arrived legation. Queen Maria Carolina was so horrified at what had happened at the Tuileries that day that she almost broke off relations with France altogether. The king and queen’s procrastination regarding Mackau's requests to be recognised as a representative of the French Republic caused tension with that country. John Acton, now Prime Minister of Naples, allayed Maria Carolina's fervent desire to go to war with France and tried to placate Mackau until he could rely on British military support. His plan, however, backfired when the French government intercepted a letter detailing how he sabotaged the diplomatic mission of Huguet de Sémonville to the Ottoman Empire. When France started making preparations for war in November to avenge this insult, the king and queen finally capitulated and begrudgingly recognized Mackau and the Republic. However, the national assembly had already sent 9 ships under Admiral Latouche Tréville to seek redress, which arrived on 17 December in Naples. Latouche stipulated that, if Acton did not apologise to him in person for the Sémonville affair, he would bombard and lay waste to Naples within an hour. The queen’s decision to accede to Latouche's demands earned her the criticism of some Neapolitan historians, like General Colletta, who overlook the fact that Naples was unable to mount a defence at the time as the navy was not mobilised.

Maria Carolina's preventatives against Jacobinism were rendered useless in the face of the subversive actives of Latouche's fleet, which was obliged to return to Naples shortly after leaving by a storm. The French sailors, "republican agents", were allowed to land on this occasion, inculcating their anti-monarchical sentiments in the Neapolitans. Upon Latouche's departure, on 29 January 1793, Maria Carolina launched an ineffective offensive against Neapolitan radicals, allowing the most dangerous schemers to escape justice. Why the offensive failed can be explained by the fact that her chief of police, Luigi de' Medici, was secretly a radical himself. Concurrently, Maria Carolina arranged a treaty of alliance with Great Britain, on whom France had latterly declared war. By this treaty, Naples was to contribute four men-of-war, four frigates and four smaller ships, along with six thousand soldiers, to protect commerce in the Mediterranean. In August 1793, following the Siege of Toulon, Naples joined the First Coalition, comprising Great Britain, Russia, Austria, Prussia, Spain, Portugal and Savoy-Sardinia, against France.

Italian campaign

The execution of Marie Antoinette in October 1793 breathed a new lease of life into the queen’s counter-revolution. Maria Carolina was so horrified by that event that she refused to speak French, "that monstrous language", and banned the "inflammatory" philosophical works of Galanti and Filangeri, who had hitherto enjoyed the queen's patronage. In 1794, following the discovery of a Jacobin plot to overthrow the government, Maria Carolina ordered Medici to suppress the Freemasons, of which she was once an adherent, believing they were partaking in treasonable activities with the French. The army was kept perpetually mobilised in case of sudden attack, occasioning a huge increase in taxation. Fearing for the safety of her family, Maria Carolina employed food-testers and switched the royal families' apartments on a daily basis. What compelled Maria Carolina to do this was the general terror reigning throughout the city, in which "nobody was safe".

The cessation of Franco-Spanish hostilities in the summer of 1795 gave Napoleon Bonaparte, a Corsican general in the French army, the opportunity to focus on France's Italian Campaign. Bonaparte's successes in Northern Italy compelled Maria Carolina to sue for peace, under which Naples had to pay to France a war indemnity of 8 million francs. However, neither country intended to observe this treaty in the long-term. The marriage of her eldest son, the Duke of Calabria, to Archduchess Maria Clementina of Austria in 1797 offered Maria Carolina a brief respite from the affairs of war, which had taken a toll on her health. Maria Carolina entered a secret defensive alliance with Austria on 20 May 1798, in response to France's occupation of the Papal States, which shared a border with Naples. After the British victory at the Battle of the Nile, the queen decided to join the Second Coalition against France; Austria sent General Mack to take command. War council meetings, comprising the queen, the king, Mack, Sir William Hamilton, the English ambassador, and Admiral Nelson, the victor of the Nile, were held in the Palace of Caserta. They decided to invade the Roman Republic, a French puppet state.

Escape and creation of the Parthenopean Republic 
When the Kingdom of Naples and Sicily joined the Second Coalition, Napoleon found a reason to act. The French General Jean Étienne Championnet succeeded rapidly, and in January 1799 he occupied Naples and forced the royal family to escape to Sicily. In the Sicilian exile Maria Carolina continued her politics towards Naples.

On 24 January 1799, the Parthenopean Republic was proclaimed in Naples by the French troops led by General Championnet. The chosen name (after Parthenope, an ancient Greek colony which existed on the site of the future city of Naples) was an attempt by the French to obtain the support of the Neapolitan people. During the republican period, a government was installed with Ercole D'Agnese as elected President, press freedom was proclaimed, and future reforms were prepared. However, after only 6 months, the young republic ended when the Sanfedisti, the army led by Cardinal Fabrizio Ruffo, attacked and invaded Naples (21 June 1799). The collapse of the republic was largely due to the English fleet, which had supplied the royal army with weapons. Again, it was Admiral Nelson who successfully defeated the French in the middle of 1799 from Naples and Sicily securing the throne for the Royal couple.

In June 1800, Maria Carolina traveled with her three unmarried daughters, her younger son Leopoldo, and accompanied by William and Emma Hamilton and Nelson over Livorno, Florence, Trieste and Laibach to Vienna, where she arrived two months later. Maria Carolina stayed two years in her homeland, where she arranged advantageous marriages for her children. In the family circle, she spent most time with her favorite grandchild, Archduchess Marie Louise of Austria, who later became the wife of her arch-enemy Napoleon.

Exile and death 

After her stay in Vienna, Maria Carolina returned to Naples on 17 August 1802. It is said that Napoleon claimed that the queen was the only man in the Kingdom of Naples. The European states were concerned by Napoleon's growing power, which reached its peak with his Imperial coronation on 18 May 1804. By 1805 Italy was again the center of interest of the new Emperor, whose crown bore the inscription Rex totius Italiae. From then on, events came quickly and Maria Carolina was surprised by the news of the defeat of Austria in the Battle of Austerlitz (2 December 1805).

Napoleon then did not hesitate to conquer Naples and installed first his brother Joseph Bonaparte, and four years later his brother-in-law Joachim Murat, on the throne of Naples. The royal family was forced to flee to Sicily in February 1806. In their exile, the refugees relied on the help of Great Britain, but after the death of Admiral Nelson in the Battle of Trafalgar (21 October 1805), the British developed more and more aversion to Maria Carolina. Finally in 1813, her husband essentially (but not officially) abdicated and appointed their son Francis regent. This deprived her of any political influence, and the queen was forced to leave Sicily and return to Vienna.

During her trip, she received the news of Napoleon's defeat at the Battle of Leipzig on 19 October 1813. After a long journey through Constantinople, Odessa, Lviv, and Budapest, Maria Carolina finally arrived in Vienna in January 1814, where she began negotiations with Prince Metternich and her nephew, Emperor Francis I of Austria, for the restoration of her husband and herself to the Neapolitan throne. However, this never happened: Maria Carolina died on 8 September as a consequence of a stroke, without seeing the final defeat of Napoleon and the restoration of her husband by the Congress of Vienna. Her maid found the queen lying dead on the floor among scattered letters.

Maria Carolina was buried in the Imperial Crypt in Vienna. Her parents and most of her siblings are also buried there.

Issue

Ancestry

Notes

References

Citations

Bibliography
Acton, Harold (1956). Bourbons of Naples. Methuen & Co.: London.
Bearne, Catherine Mary (1907). A Sister of Marie Antoinette: The Life-Story of Maria Carolina, Queen of Naples. T. Fisher Unwin: London
Crankshaw, Edward (1969). Maria Theresa. Longman Publishers: London.
Davis, John Anthony (2006). Naples and Napoleon: southern Italy and the European revolutions (1780–1860). Oxford University Press: Oxford. 
Fraser, Antonia (2002). Marie Antoinette: The Journey. Phoenix: London. 
Jackson, Gudia M (2000). Women Rulers Throughout the Ages: An Illustrated Guide. Abc-Clio: Santa Barbara. 
Jones, Colin (2002). The Great Nation: France from Louis XV to Napoleon. Columbia University Press: New York. 
Lever, Evelyn (2001). Marie Antoinette: The Last Queen of France. Judy Piatkus: London. 
Nagel, Susan. (2008). Marie Thérèse: The Fate of Marie Antoinette's Daughter. Bloosmbury: New York. 
Tarabra, Daniela (2008). European Art of the Eighteenth Century. The J. Paul Getty Museum: Los Angeles. 
Vernon, Mrs HM. (1909). Italy: From 1494 to 1790. Cambridge University Press: London.
Vovk, Justin C. (2010).  In Destiny's Hands: Five Tragic Rulers, Children of Maria Theresa.  iUniverse: Bloomington, Ind.  
Wheatcroft, Andrew (1996). The Habsburgs: Embodying Empire. Penguin Books: London.

External links

|-

|-

|-

1752 births
1814 deaths
18th-century Austrian people
19th-century Austrian people
18th-century Austrian women
19th-century Austrian women
Nobility from Vienna
House of Habsburg-Lorraine
House of Bourbon-Two Sicilies
Royal consorts of Naples
Royal consorts of Sicily
Austria, Maria Carolina d'
Freemasonry in Italy
Austrian princesses
Spanish infantas
Austrian Roman Catholics
Burials at the Imperial Crypt
Burials at St. Stephen's Cathedral, Vienna
Knights of the Order of Saint Stephen of Hungary
Daughters of emperors
Children of Maria Theresa
Daughters of kings